Jeremiah F. O'Connor (May 18, 1933 – May 13, 2020) was an American politician who served in the New Jersey Senate from the 13th district from 1966 to 1968.

O'Connor was born in Manhattan and He graduated from Rice High School. He went on to receive his bachelor's degree in economics and finances from Iona College in New Rochelle, New York. He worked in financial institutions and banking in New Jersey.

O'Connor served on the Saddle Brook township board and as mayor of Saddle Brook. O'Connor served on the Bergen County Board of Chosen Freeholders. He died on May 13, 2020, in Edgewater, at age 86.

References

1933 births
2020 deaths
People from Saddle Brook, New Jersey
Politicians from Bergen County, New Jersey
Politicians from Manhattan
Iona University alumni
Businesspeople from New Jersey
Mayors of places in New Jersey
New Jersey city council members
County commissioners in New Jersey
Democratic Party New Jersey state senators